Maine's 7th congressional district is an obsolete congressional district in the U.S. state of Maine. It was created in 1821 after Maine was admitted to the Union in 1820. The district was eliminated in 1853 following the 1850 Census. Its last Congressman was Thomas Fuller.

List of members representing the district

References

 Congressional Biographical Directory of the United States 1774–present

07
Former congressional districts of the United States
Constituencies established in 1821
Constituencies disestablished in 1853
1821 establishments in Maine
1853 disestablishments in Maine